Garanduwa Baarage Palitha Silva (born August 30, 1967, as පාලිත සිල්වා) [Sinhala]) is a Sri Lankan actor, dramatist, producer, director, scriptwriter, and author.  He started his career at 15 years of age when he was chosen to train at the esteemed Professor Solomon Fonseka's school of Acting. Silva has acted in more than 400 television serials and is best known for the roles in teledramas Keetaya, Deweni Inima and titular character in the biographical film Anagarika Dharmapala Srimathano. He was awarded the honorific titles of Maanava Hithavadee Keerthi Sri Veeraputra Deshabandu in (June 2019) and Kalaashubana Janaranjana Keerthi Sri Deshamanya (July 2021)  for his service towards Buddhism in Sri Lanka. He was also cast in the international film Shadow of the Cobra Starring Art Malik, Michael Woods and Arthur Dignam.

Personal life
He is married to his longtime partner, Namalee Silva. She is the Deputy Chief Superintendent of the Marketing Division of Sri Lanka Insurance. She went to Holy Family Convent in Bambalapitiya and Devi Balika Vidyalaya in Colombo. Then Namalee graduated with a marketing degree from the Chartered Institute of Marketing, London. She knew Palitha since 10 years of age. They both lived in the same village, Mount Lavinia and both attended the same Dhamma School, Mount Lavinia Dhammodaya Dhamma School.

Theater career
His entry to theater and drama came through Dharmasiri Bandaranayake's drama Ekadhipathy. Winning his first state youth award for script writing, directing and acting in Thawath ek wiroopiyek, at the young age of 16, in 1983, at 18 years old, he went on to act in Sri Lanka's most critically acclaimed stage drama Sargent Nallathambi alongside Nihal Silva.  . Silva also studied and acted under the directorship of Helena Lehtimäki in her productions of Bertolt Brecht's Mr Puntila and his Man Matti and William Shakespeare's Midsummer Night's Dreams. In 1988, Silva was nominated for the best actor award at the National State Drama festival for playing the character of Estragon in a production of Samuel Beckette's Waiting for Godot. In 1994, Silva won the Best Actor Award at the State Drama festival for Kaspa.  

In 1984, his maiden theater direction came through the play Ballangen Pravesam Wenu., the play gained much awards and accolades at the National Youth Drama festival. He also directed stage plays for many schools such as Holy Family Convent, Bambalapitiya and S. Thomas' College, Mount Lavinia. He has also worked with many British and German dramatists.

After 28 years, he directed another stage play called Circus Karayo, which was first presented at Lionel Wendt Theater on 31 July 2012.

Notable works
 Ekadhipathy
 Ballangen Pravesam Wenu
 Circus Karayo
 Security Sinnathambi
 Sihina Deshayen
 Saree Gete
 Caspaar - accompany with German dramatist
 Kelani Palama
 Sihina Rangahala

Television career
In 1998, Silva directed the tele film, Amuththek Awith which won awards. In 2000, he directed Thrasthawadinge Ghathanaya for Swarnavahini.
He became more popular through the drama mystery television serial Keetaya which was telecasted on Independent Television Network. Currently, he acting in the soap opera Deweni Inima as cricket coach.

Notable works

 Abhisamaya
 Ada Ada Ei Maru
 Adaraneeya Amma 
 Ahasin Watuna Gahaniyak 
 Ambu Daruwo
 Apuru Sahodaraya
 Asanwara Wessak
 Athma Senehasa
 Chandra Vinsathi
 Dambulugala Sakmana 
 Dedunu Sihina (2008)
 Deweni Inima as Ekanayake Sir (2016-2019)
 Diya Matha Ruwa 
 Diya Sewaneli
 Diya Suliya
 Durganthaya
 Eka Iththaka Mal
 Gamane ya (2020)
 Ganga Addara Kele
 Gini Avi Saha Gini Keli (2014)
 Golu Hadawatha
 Guru Geethaya 
 Ira Awara (2015)
 Jeewithaya Horu Aran 
 Kadupul Mal (2002)
 Kampitha Vill (2008)
 Katu Imbula as Sugatha Banda
 Keetaya 1,2,3,4
 Kinnara Damanaya 
 Kiripabalu Vila 
 Mahathala Hatana (2007)
 Magul Sakwala (1998) as Senaka 
 Manikkawatha 
 Maya Ranaga 
 Maya Roo (2010)
 Mayura Asapuwa 
 Meeduma (2003)
 Mini Palanga (2003)
 Nidikumba Mal
 Nil Mal Viyana (2004) 
 Nim Walalla 
 Once Upon a Time in Colombo (2021)
 Pethi Ahulana Mala 
 Piniwassa
 Ran Poruwa 
 Roda Hatara Manamalaya (2004) 
 Romeo And Dante (2012)
 Samanalayano
 Sanda Gomman Re (2007)
 Sanda Sanda Wage
 Sayaweni Patumaga 
 Senakeliyay Maya
 Shoba (2007)
 Sikuru Udanaya (1998)
 Sinasenna Mata
 Sisila Ima
 Situ Gedara
 Sivusiya Gawwa (2001)
 Sudu Kaluwara as Dingiri Banda (2003)
 Suseema as Ranga (1980s)
 Suwanda Hamana Manamali
 Thalaya Soyana Geethaya (2005) 
 Urumayaka Aragalaya (2018)
 Veera Puran Appu (2017-18)
 Vinivindimi
 Visi Ekwana Horawa
 Wanawadule Wasanthaya (2000)
 Wara Peraliya (2005) 
 Wes Benduma (2003)
 Yuga Wilakkuwa (1997)

Beyond acting
He worked as the Workshop director of The Young Learners' Center at the British Council.  He stated that his greatest ambition is to be a writer. He has published two novels, E Deegeka Giyaya in 1998 and the Athek Barata Henduvak on 8 October 2004. He also works as director, scriptwriter and a lecturer on cinematography.

Filmography
Silva started his film career with Kawuluwa in 1987, directed by Jackson Anthony with a minor role. His most popular cinema acting came through films Sir Last Chance, Anagarika Dharmapala Srimathano and Maharaja Ajasath. The role in Maharaja Ajasath as Arahat Devadatta was highly praised by the critics.
 
 No. denotes the Number of Sri Lankan film in the Sri Lankan cinema.

Awards and accolades
He has won several awards at the local stage drama festivals and television festivals, both for acting and direction.

Awards

|-
|| ||| Induru Dora || Best Actor || 
|-
|| ||| Durganathaya || Best Actor || 
|-
|| ||| Gamata Amuththek Avith || Best Stage Actor || 
|-
|| ||| Gamata Amuththek Avith || Best Single-Episode Director  ||

References

External links
මහ රෑ හීනෙන් පාලිත බිරිඳගේ ඇඟට උඩින් පැන්න හැටි
කුකුල් මස්‌ අඩු හප හපා ධර්මපාල චරිතය - palitha Silva
Action Heroes
 ජීවිතේ එක පාරක් හරි නැරඹිය යුතු අපේ සුපිරි ටෙලි 8ක්

Sri Lankan male film actors
Sinhalese male actors
Living people
1967 births